Frontiers in Energy is a quarterly peer-reviewed scientific journal on energy. It is published by Springer Science+Business Media on behalf of the Higher Education Press. The editors-in-chief are Shilie Weng (Shanghai Jiao Tong University), Weidou Ni (Tsinghua University), and Suping Peng (China University of Mining and Technology). The journal was established in 2007 as Frontiers of Energy and Power Engineering in China, before obtaining its current title.

Abstracting and indexing 
The journal is abstracted and indexed in:

References

External links 

Engineering journals
Quarterly journals
English-language journals
Springer Science+Business Media academic journals
Publications established in 2007